"When U Think About Me" is a song by Filipino-American R&B girl group One Vo1ce, released as the second single from their 1999 debut album Just the Beginning. The single reached number 96 on the Hot R&B/Hip-Hop Songs chart, and number 17 on the US Rhythmic Top 40 chart. A music video was also released for the song.

It was also used in an original MTV film called Jailbait.

Billy Crawford version

The song was covered in 2002 by the Filipino-American singer Billy Crawford as "When You Think About Me" alongside a released music video. The song also appears in his second studio album Ride. It charted in European charts peaking at No. 14 in France as well as charting in Belgium, Germany, Netherlands, and Switzerland.

Track listing
The remixed 12" release contains five remixes.
"When You Think About Me (Club Remix by Shanon)" (5:08)
"When You Think About Me (Two Step Mix)" (3:48)
"When You Think About Me (The Orange Factory Remix)" (3:32)
"When You Think About Me (The Beat Clinic Remix)" (3:08)
"When You Think About Me (Radio Mix (Long Remix))" (3:20)

Charts
One Vo1ce/Voice V version

Billy Crawford version

References

1999 songs
1999 singles
2002 singles
Billy Crawford songs